The Cornwall League 1 2007–08 was a full season of rugby union within Cornwall League 1.

Team Changes
Saltash as Champions, were promoted to the Tribute Cornwall/Devon League for season 2008–09. There was no relegation into Cornwall 1 and no relegation into Cornwall League 2.

Table

Points are awarded as follows:
 2 points for a win
 1 point for a draw
 0 points for a loss

References

Cornwall
2007